The Barnett-Aden Gallery was a nonprofit art gallery in Washington D.C. founded by James V. Herring and Alonzo J. Aden, who were associated with Howard University's art department and gallery.  The gallery, which opened on October 16, 1943 and operated until 1969, was the first successful Black-owned private art gallery in the United States; showcased numerous important artists; and became an important, racially integrated part of the artistic and social worlds of 1940s and 1950s Washington, D.C.

The gallery was located in the first floor of the 127 Randolph Place, NW row home shared by the two founders, who were life partners. Herring joined the Howard faculty in 1921, started the University's Art department in 1922, was its head until he retired in 1953, and founded the University's Gallery of Art in 1928 (it opened in 1930).  Aden, a former student of Herring's at Howard who was the first curator of the University's Gallery of Art until he left that position in 1943, was the director of the Barnett-Aden gallery, and it was named after his mother, Naomi Barnett Aden.

Artists featured at the gallery included Alma Thomas, Elizabeth Catlett, Lois Mailou Jones, Charles White, Edward Mitchell Bannister, Jacob Lawrence, Laura Wheeler Waring, Romare Bearden, Henry O. Tanner and Bernice Cross.  The collection featured artists of every race, particularly African American artists whose work was shown in few other venues. "...there were few such opportunities in the years following World War II...in those bleak years, the Barnett-Aden Gallery was one of the few private galleries where Black painters, sculptors and graphic artists had a continuing opportunity to expose their works.”

The gallery opened on October 16, 1943 with the exhibition "American Paintings for the Home." It was officially incorporated on August 19, 1947.  The early gallery as it existed in 1947 can be seen in the painting First Gallery by John Robinson. Exhibitions, shows, receptions and other events provided a racially integrated gathering place for the art community in a segregated city from the 1940s-1960s.

Eleanor Roosevelt was photographed visiting the Barnett-Aden Gallery in 1944, as First Lady.  Romare Bearden said that the first time he saw a Matisse in Washington was at the Barnett-Aden. Therese Schwartz wrote that the Barnett-Aden was the most important art gallery in America south of New York.

The gallery began to decline in the late 1950s.  After the death of the founders in 1961 (Aden) and 1969 (Herring), the gallery closed and the bulk of the gallery's collection was transferred via Adolphus Ealey to the Museum of African American Art in Tampa, FL, (now defunct) as well as to private collections. The collection was shown in the 1970s at the Anacostia Neighborhood Museum of the Smithsonian Institution and the Corcoran Gallery of Art. The majority of the collection was owned by Robert L. Johnson.  In 2015, he donated portions to the National Museum of African American History and Culture.

Notes

References

Art museums and galleries in Washington, D.C.
Defunct art museums and galleries in the United States
1943 establishments in Washington, D.C.
Art galleries established in 1943